Ndende  may refer to the following places in Africa:

Ndendé, a town in Ngounié Province, Gabon
Ndende, Republic of Congo, Republic of Congo
Ndende, Tanzania, Tanzania
Ndende, Zambia, Zambia